This is a list of Catholic seminaries in the world, including those that have been closed. According to the 2012 Pontifical Yearbook, the total number of candidates for the priesthood in the world was 118,990 at the end of the year 2010. These students were in 6,974 seminaries around the world: 3,194 diocesan seminaries and 3,780 religious seminaries.

Africa

Benin
 Saint-Gall de Ouidah Major Seminary
via

Congo, Democratic Republic of
 Grand Séminaire de Lubumbashi - for the Roman Catholic Archdiocese of Lubumbashi
 Grand Séminaire Jean XXIII - for the Roman Catholic Archdiocese of Kinshasa

Ghana
 St. Gregory the Great Provincial Major Seminary - for the Roman Catholic Province of Kumasi
 St. Paul's Catholic Seminary (Philosophy)
 St. Peter's Regional Seminary (Theology) 
 St. Victor's, Tamale
 St Teresa's Minor Seminary

Namibia
 St. Charles Lwanga Major Seminary - of Namibian Catholic Bishops' Conference

Nigeria
 St. John Vianney Seminary, Barkin Ladi - Established in January 1958 by the late Right Rev. Dr. John Reddington for the Roman Catholic Archdiocese of Jos.
 Seat of Wisdom Seminary - Established in 1982; for the Roman Catholic Archdiocese of Owerri
Seat of Wisdom Seminary (philosophy Campus), Ariam-Umuahia
 Bigard Memorial Seminary, Enugu - A provincial seminary for the Onitsha ecclesiastical province, established in 1950.
 St Albert the Great Idowu Ofonron Abeokuta, Ogun State 
 St Joseph Major Seminary, Ikot Ekpene
 St Thomas Aquinas Major Seminary, Makurdi
 Pope John Paul II Major Seminary, Awka
 SS Peter and Paul, Bodija, Ibadan
 All Saints Seminary, Ekpoma
Good Shepherd Major Seminary, Kaduna
Claretian Institute of Philosophy, Nekede
Spiritan International school of Theology, Attakwu
Spiritan Institute of Philosophy, Isienu
St Augustine Seminary, Jos
Blessed Iwene Tansi Major Seminary, Onitsha
The National Missionary Seminary of St Paul, Gwagwalada Abuja

South Africa
 St John Vianney Seminary - Pretoria (National Seminary)
 St Francis Xavier Orientation Year Seminary (Cape Town)
 Redemptoris Mater Seminary for training priests of the Neo-Catechumenal Way (Cape Town)
 St Joseph's Theological Institute
 St Philip Neri collegium (Preparatory year seminary)

Togo
 Jean Paul II Interdiocesan Major Seminary, Lomé
 St Paul Interdiocesan Major Seminary, Kpalimé
 Benoit XVI Interdiocesan Major Seminary, Tchitchao

Uganda
There are several Seminaries in Uganda divided into three; Junior, Minor and Major seminaries.

Major seminaries
St. Mbaaga's Major Seminary, Ggaba (Philosophy and Theology) 
St. Mary's National Seminary, Ggaba (Theology) 
St. Thomas Aquinas National Seminary, Katigondo (Philosophy)
Uganda Martyrs National Major Seminary, Alokolum (Philosophy) 
St. Paul's National Seminary, Kinyamasika (Theology) 
Minor and Junior Seminaries 
Bukalasa Minor Seminary
Christ the King Seminary, Kisubi, 
St. Joseph's Seminary, Nyenga - minor seminary
Mubende Seminary - in Nandele and Nyenga; minor seminary
Nadiket seminary - for the dioceses of Kotido and Moroto
Saint Charles seminary - minor seminary
Saints Gabriel and Raphael Seminary - located in Nswanjere; junior seminary
St. Pius X Seminary - Nagongera - Located in Tororo district; West Budama County; Junior and Minor Seminary
St. Paul's Seminary - Rushoroza - in Kabale for Kabale Diocese; minor seminary
 Kitabi Seminary in Bushenyi for Mbarara Arch diocese; minor seminary
 Sacred Heart Mission for the Brothers of Divine Mercy; Missionary preparation
 Sacred Heart Seminary Lacor - Gulu archdiocese
 St. Peter's Seminary-Madera) - in Soroti for Soroti Diocese; minor seminary
 St. John Bosco Minor Seminary, Hoima - in Hoima Diocese
 Sts. Peter & Paul Seminary Pokea,Arua- minor Seminary for Arua diocese and Nebbi Diocese

Americas

Argentina
Argentina has 32 major seminaries.
 Facultades de Filosofía y Teología de San Miguel, San Miguel, Buenos Aires
 Seminario Mayor Nuestra Señora de Luján - for the Archdiocese of La Plata
 Seminario Metropolitano de Buenos Aires - for the Archdiocese of Buenos Aires

Bolivia
 Seminario Mayor San luis, Cochabamba.

Brazil
By the 'Organización de Seminarios Latinoamericanos' (OSLAM), there are 429 seminaries in Brazil. The following list is by leading Ecclesiastical Provinces.

Aparecida
 Seminário Missionário Bom Jesus - founded in 1844; for the Roman Catholic Archdiocese of Aparecida
 Seminário Redentorista Santo Alfonso - for the Archdiocese of Aparecida

Belém do Pará
 Seminário Dom Oscar Romeo - for the Roman Catholic Archdiocese of Belém do Pará
 Seminário Maior Interdiocesano São Gaspar - for the Archdiocese of Belém

Belo Horizonte
 Seminário Coração Eucarísto de Jesus - for the Roman Catholic Archdiocese of Belo Horizonte
 Seminário Pavoniano Ludovico Pavani - for the Archdiocese of Belo Horizonte

Brasília
 Seminário Maior Arquidiocesano Nossa Senhora de Fátima — for the Roman Catholic Archdiocese of Brasília

Campinas
 Seminário Claret - for the Roman Catholic Archdiocese of Campinas
 Seminário da Imaculada Teologia - for the Archdiocese of Campinas

Cascavel
 Seminário Diocesano Maria Mãe de Igreja - for the Roman Catholic Diocese of Toledo, Brazil

Curitiba
 Seminário Arquidiocesano São José - for the Roman Catholic Archdiocese of Curitiba
 Seminário Nossa Senhora Consolata - for the Archdiocese of Curitiba

Fortaleza
 Seminário da Prainha - founded in 1864; for the Roman Catholic Archdiocese of Fortaleza
 Semonário Propedêutico D. Aluísio Lorscheider - for the Archdiocese of Fortaleza

Goiânia
 Seminário Interdiocesano São João Maria Vianney

Guarulhos
 Seminário Diocesano Imaculada Conceição - for the Roman Catholic Diocese of Guarulhos
 Seminário Propedêutico Santo Antônio - for the Roman Catholic Diocese of Guarulhos

Mariana
 Seminário Diocesano de Nossa Senhora do Rosário - for the Roman Catholic Diocese of Caratinga

Natal
 Seminário de São Pedro - for the Roman Catholic Archdiocese of Natal

Niteroi
 Seminário São José - for the Roman Catholic Archdiocese of Niterói
 Seminário São Vicente de Paulo - for the Roman Catholic Diocese of Petrópolis

Nova Friburgo
 Seminário Diocesano da Imaculada Conceição - for the Roman Catholic Diocese of Nova Friburgo

Olinda e Recife
 Seminário Arquidiocesano de Comunicação - for the Roman Catholic Archdiocese of Olinda e Recife

Porto Alegre
 Seminário Maior Arquidiocesno Nossa Senhora da Conceição - for the Archdiocese of Porto Alegre
 Seminário Maior João Duns Scotus - for the Archdiocese of Porto Alegre

São Paulo
 Seminário de Teologia Bom Pastor - for the Archdiocese of São Paulo
 Seminário de Filosofia Santa Cura d'Ars - for the Archdiocese of São Paulo
 Seminário Paulino - for the Archdiocese of São Paulo
 Seminário São Francisco de Paula - for the Archdiocese of São Paulo
 Missionário Saletinos - for the Archdiocese of São Paulo
 Missionário Teológico Santa Mônica - for the Archdiocese of São Paulo
 Seminário Frei Galvão - located in Guaratinguetá in the state of Sao Paulo
 Seminário Nossa Senhora Aparecida - for the Roman Catholic Diocese of Campo Limpo

São Salvador da Bahia
 Seminário Central São João Maria Vianney - for the Archdiocese of São Salvador da Bahia
 Seminário Maior Santana Mestra - for the Archdiocese of São Salvador da Bahia

São Sebastião do Rio de Janeiro
 Seminário São José - founded in 1739; for the Archdiocese of São Sebastião do Rio de Janeiro
 Seminário Maior Palotino - for the Archdiocese of Rio de Janeiro

Vitória
 Seminário Nossa Senhora da Penha - for the Roman Catholic Archdiocese of Vitória

Canada

Alberta
 St. Joseph Seminary (Edmonton, Alberta) - Opened in 1927

British Columbia
 Seminary of Christ the King - In Westminster Abbey of Benedictine, Mission; Founded in 1939

Ontario

 St. Augustine's Seminary - Archdiocesan seminary of the Archdiocese of Toronto; established in 1913
 St. Peter's Seminary - Located in the Diocese of London, Ontario. Established in 1912, and affiliated with King's University College, University of Western Ontario
 St. Philip's Seminary - Archdiocesan seminary of the Archdiocese of Toronto; established in 1986
 Serra House - Archdiocesan house of formation of the Archdiocese of Toronto where pre-theology seminarians reside; established in 1984 as a House of Discernment to the Priesthood

Quebec
 Grand séminaire de Montréal - Founded by the Society of Saint-Sulpice in 1840, serving the Roman Catholic Archdiocese of Montreal
 Séminaire de Québec - Founded in 1663; for the Roman Catholic Archdiocese of Quebec

Closed:
 Immaculate Conception Seminary, in Cornwall, Ontario, ran by the Legionaries of Christ.
 Séminaire de Chicoutimi, Quebec, - For the Roman Catholic Diocese of Chicoutimi
 Séminaire de Saint-Hyacinthe, Quebec, - For the Roman Catholic Diocese of Saint-Hyacinthe

Chile
 San Fidel Seminary, Pontifical Catholic University of Chile - In Santiago

Colombia
Colombia has 50 major seminaries.
 Major Seminary of Bogotá - for the Archdiocese of Bogotá
 Seminairo Misionero Arquidiocesano Redemptoris Mater de Medellin - for the Roman Catholic Archdiocese of Medellín
 Seminario Mayor Intermisional Colombiano San Luis Beltrán - located in Bogotá

Cuba
 San Carlos and San Ambrosio Seminary - Established in 1689; Serves the Archdiocese of Havana

Dominican Republic
 St. Thomas Aquinas Pontifical Seminary - for the Archdiocese of Santo Domingo

Ecuador
 Seminario Mayor San Jose, Quito

Mexico
There are 66 seminaries in Mexico. This list is by main Ecclesiastical Provinces.

Acapulco
 Seminario del Buen Pastor - for the Roman Catholic Archdiocese of Acapulco

Antequera, Oaxaca
 Seminario Pontificio de la Santa Cruz - for the Archdiocese of Antequera, Oaxaca

Chihuahua
 Seminario Arquidiocesano de Chihuahua, A.R. - for the Roman Catholic Archdiocese of Chihuahua

Durango
 Seminario Conciliar Mayor de Durango - for the Archdiocese of Durango

Guadalajara
 Seminario del Señor San José - for the Archdiocese of Guadalajara
 Seminario Diocesano de Guadalajara - for the Archdiocese of Guadalajara

Hermosillo
 Seminario Arquidiocesnao Juan Navarrete y Guerrero - for the Roman Catholic Archdiocese of Hermosillo

Jalapa
 Seminario Interdiocesano Rafael Guízar y Valecia - for the Roman Catholic Archdiocese of Jalapa

México
 Seminario Conciliar de México - for the Archdiocese of Mexico
 Seminario Méxicano para las Misiones Extranjeras - located in Mexico City

Monterrey
 Seminario Arquidiocesano de Monterrey - for the Archdiocese of Monterrey

Morelia
 Seminario Arquidiocesano de Morelia - for the Roman Catholic Archdiocese of Morelia

Puebla de los Angeles
 Pontificio Seminario Conciliar Palafoxiano Angelopolitano - for the Roman Catholic Archdiocese of Puebla de los Angeles

San Luis Potosí
 Seminarios Diocesanos de San Luis Potosi - for the Roman Catholic Archdiocese of San Luis Potosi
 Seminario Guadalupano y Josefino - For the Archdiocese of San Luis Potosi

Tlalnepantla
 Seminarios Diocesanos de Tlalnepantla - for the Roman Catholic Archdiocese of Tlalnepantla

Yucatán
 Seminario Conciliar de Nuestra Señora del Rosario y de San Ildefonso - for the Roman Catholic Archdiocese of Yucatán, located in the city of Mérida

Paraguay
 Seminario Mayor Nacional del Paraguay, Asuncion

Peru
 Seminario de Lima - for the Archdiocese of Lima
 Seminario de San Jerónimo - for the Archdiocese of Arequipa

Puerto Rico
 Regina Cleri Seminary (Ponce, Puerto Rico) – Diocesan seminary for the Diocese of Ponce, Puerto Rico.

Trinidad and Tobago
 Regional Seminary of St John Vianney and the Ugandan Martyrs in Tunapuna, Trinidad - founded in 1943, became a regional seminary for the Antilles Episcopal Conference in 1970. Jamaican seminarians formerly at St. Michael's Theological College were moved to Trinidad in 1996.

United States
According to the 2010 Official Catholic Directory, as of 2009 there are 189 seminaries with 5,131 students in the United States; 3,319 diocesan seminarians and 1,812 religious seminarians. By the official 2011 statistics, there are 5,247 seminarians (3,394 diocesan and 1,853 religious) in the United States.

California

 Dominican School of Philosophy and Theology (Berkeley) - Run by the Dominican Friars; opened in 1964.
 Franciscan School of Theology (Oceanside) - Run by the Franciscan Friars; opened in 1854.
 Immaculate Conception Apostolic School (Colfax) - Was run by the Legionaries of Christ but closed in 2011.
 Jesuit School of Theology of Santa Clara University (Berkeley) - Run by the Society of Jesus; opened in 1969.
 Juan Diego House (Gardena) - Archdiocesan seminary.
 St. Anthony Seminary & College (Santa Barbara) - Run by the Franciscan Friars; opened in 1901.
 St. John's Seminary (Camarillo) - Archdiocesan seminary; opened in 1939. Formerly operated by the Congregation of the Mission from 1939 to 1987.
 St. Patrick Seminary (Menlo Park) - Archdiocesan seminary; opened in 1898.
 St. Peter Chanel Seminary (Berkeley) - Run by the Marist Fathers.
 Blessed Junipero Serra House of Formation       (Grand Terrace, California) - Run by the Diocese of San Bernardino; opened in 1995.

Colorado
 St. John Vianney Seminary (Denver) - Archdiocesan seminary; opened in 1999. Opened at the site of the former St. Thomas Seminary operated by the Congregation of the Mission from 1907 to 1995.
 Redemptoris Mater Seminary (Denver) - Archdiocesan missionary seminary consisting of vocations from the Neocatechumenal Way; opened in 1996.

Connecticut
 Holy Apostles Seminary (Cromwell) - Diocesan seminary; opened in 1960. Formerly run by the Missionaries of the Holy Apostles.
 Novitiate and College of Humanities of the Legionaries of Christ (Cheshire) - Seminary currently run by the Legionaries of Christ.
 St. John Fisher Seminary Residence (Stamford) - Diocesan seminary; opened in 1989.
 St. Thomas Seminary (Bloomfield) - Archdiocesan seminary; opened in 1897.

District of Columbia
 Saint John Paul II Seminary - Archdiocese of Washington; opened in 2011.
 Dominican House of Studies - Run by the Dominican Friars; opened in 1905.
 Redemptoris Mater Seminary - Archdiocesan missionary seminary consisting of vocations from the Neocatechumenal Way; erected 2001.
 Theological College - Run by the Society of St. Sulpice; opened in 1917.
 Washington Theological Union - Sponsored by seven religious communities; opened in 1968, closed in 2015.
 St. Joseph's Seminary - major seminary run by the Josephites, founded in 1888; later an independent academic seminary, but residential-only beginning in the early 1970s

Florida
 St. John Vianney College Seminary (Miami) - Founded in 1959
 St. Vincent de Paul Regional Seminary (Boynton Beach) - Diocesan seminary; founded in 1963.
 Redemptoris Mater Seminary (Miami) - Archdiocesan missionary seminary consisting of vocations from the Neocatechumenal Way; opened 2011.

Illinois
 Catholic Theological Union (Chicago) - Run by twenty-four various religious institutes; opened in 1968.
 University of Saint Mary of the Lake (Mundelein) - Archdiocesan major seminary; opened in 1921.

Indiana
 Bishop Simon Bruté College Seminary (Indianapolis) - Archdiocesan seminary; opened in 2004.
 Moreau Seminary (Notre Dame) - Run by the Congregation of Holy Cross; opened in 1958.
 Old College, University of Notre Dame (Notre Dame) - Undergraduate seminary of the Congregation of Holy Cross; opened in 1843.
 Sacred Heart Apostolic School (Rolling Prairie) - Run by the Legionaries of Christ; opened in 2005.
 Saint Meinrad School of Theology (St. Meinrad) - Run by the Benedictine Monks; opened in 1857.

Iowa
 Divine Word College (Epworth) - Run by the Society of the Divine Word; opened in 1931
 St. Pius X Seminary at Loras College (Dubuque) - Archdiocesan seminary; opened in 1839.

Louisiana
 Notre Dame Seminary (New Orleans) - Archdiocesan seminary; opened in 1923.
 St. Joseph Seminary College (St. Benedict) - Run by the Benedictine Monks; opened in 1891.
 Maryhill Seminary (Pineville) - Diocesan seminary; opened date and closed date TBA

Maryland
 Fulton Sheen House of Formation (Chillum) - Run by the Institute of the Incarnate Word; opened in 1998.
 Mount St. Mary's Seminary (Emmitsburg) - Archdiocesan seminary; opened in 1808.
 St. Mary's Seminary (Baltimore) - Archdiocesan seminary; opened in 1791.

Massachusetts
 Pope St. John XXIII National Seminary (Weston) - Archdiocesan seminary for adult vocations; opened in 1964.
 Our Lady of Grace Seminary (Boston) - Run by the Oblates of the Virgin Mary; opened in 1978.
 Redemptoris Mater Seminary (Chestnut Hill) - Archdiocesan missionary seminary consisting of vocations from the Neocatechumenal Way; erected 2005.
 St. John's Seminary (Boston) - Archdiocesan seminary; opened in 1884.
 Queen of Apostles Seminary – operated by the Society of African Missions from 1946 to the late 1960s.

Michigan
 Sacred Heart Major Seminary (Detroit) - Archdiocesan seminary; opened in 1919.
 Ss. Cyril & Methodius Seminary (Orchard Lake) - National seminary for Polish immigrants; opened in 1885.

Minnesota
 Blessed Jose Sanchez del Rio Minor Seminary (Mankato) -High school seminary run by the Institute of the Incarnate Word; opened in 2008.
 Immaculate Heart of Mary Seminary (Winona) - Diocesan seminary; opened in 1948.
 Saint John's School of Theology∙Seminary (Collegeville) - Saint John's School of Theology∙Seminary; opened in 1857 as Saint John's Seminary.
 St. John Vianney College Seminary (St. Paul)
 Saint Paul Seminary School of Divinity (St. Paul) - Archdiocesan seminary; opened in 1894.
Mississippi

 St. Augustine Seminary - former minor seminary run by the Society of the Divine Word; founded in 1920 and closed in 1967. Now a retreat center.

Missouri
 Conception Seminary College (Conception) - Run by the Benedictine Monks; opened in 1886.
 Kenrick–Glennon Seminary (Shrewsbury, St. Louis County) - Run by the Archdiocese of Saint Louis; founded in 1898.
 St. Mary's of the Barrens Seminary (Perryville) - Run by the Congregation of the Mission; operated 1818–1995.
 St. Vincent's Seminary (Cape Girardeau) - Run by the Congregation of the Mission; operated 1838-1979 as a minor seminary.

Nebraska
 Our Lady of Guadalupe Seminary (Denton) - Run by the Priestly Fraternity of St. Peter; opened in 2000.
 St. Gregory the Great Seminary (Seward) - Diocesan seminary; opened in 1998

New Jersey
 Immaculate Conception Seminary School of Theology (South Orange) - Founded in 1860 and part of Seton Hall University.
 Redemptoris Mater Seminary (Kearny, New Jersey) - Archdiocesan missionary seminary consisting of vocations from the Neocatechumenal Way; opened in 1991. Undergraduate and graduate theological studies take place at Seton Hall University.
 The College Seminary of the Immaculate Conception at St. Andrew's Hall (South Orange, New Jersey) - Diocesan Minor Seminary located on the campus of Seton Hall University.
 Blessed John Neumann Preparatory Seminary (Wayne, New Jersey) - Diocesan minor seminary founded in 1965; became co-ed college prep with name changed to Neumann Prep in the late 1970s; closed 1990.
 St. Anthony's Mission House - former seminary run by the Society of African Missions. Intended as an interracial institution open to African Americans, but folded quickly.

New York
 St. Joseph's Seminary (Dunwoodie) - Archdiocesan seminary; opened in 1896. From September 2013, it received students from the closed Seminary of the Immaculate Conception. It provides formation in the Greater New York Area (the Archdiocese, Brooklyn, and Rockville Center).
 Cathedral Seminary House of Formation (Douglaston) - Opened in 1967 as Cathedral College for the Archdiocese of New York and the Dioceses of Brooklyn and Rockville Center in 1967. It was converted to Cathedral Seminary Residence in 1989. It serves as the minor seminary for the Greater New York Area (the Archdiocese, Brooklyn, and Rockville Center) and for college-level seminarians from the Dioceses of Scranton, Syracuse, and the Diocese of Albany.
 Epiphany Apostolic College - former minor seminary run by the Josephites; founded in Baltimore in 1889 and later moved near Newburgh in 1925; eventually closed for seminary studies in 1970, and operated as a Catholic high school until 1975.
North Carolina
 St Joseph College Seminary (Charlotte) - Diocesan Minor Seminary located on the Campus of Belmont Abbey College by the Diocese of Charlotte and assisted by the Benedictine Monks of Belmont Abbey; opened in 2016.

Ohio
 Athenaeum of Ohio-Mount St. Mary Seminary (Cincinnati) - Diocesan seminary; opened in 1829
 Borromeo College Seminary (Cleveland) - Diocesan seminary; opened in 1953.
 Pontifical College Josephinum (Columbus) - International seminary of pontifical status; opened in 1888
 Saint Mary Seminary and Graduate School of Theology (Cleveland) - Established in 1848

Oregon
 Mount Angel Seminary (St. Benedict) - Run by the Order of Saint Benedict; opened in 1889.

Pennsylvania

 Byzantine Catholic Seminary of Ss. Cyril and Methodius (Pittsburgh) - Metropolitan Ruthenian seminary established in 1950
 Saint Charles Borromeo Seminary (Philadelphia) – Archdiocesan seminary; opened in 1832. The current Theological Building was completed in 1871.
 St. Paul Seminary (Pittsburgh) – Diocesan seminary for the Diocese of Pittsburgh.
 St. Vincent Seminary (Latrobe) – Diocesan seminary; Benedictine affiliated; opened in 1855.
 St. Mark Seminary (Erie) - Diocesan seminary.
 Redemptoris Mater Seminary (Philadelphia) - Archdiocesan missionary seminary consisting of vocations from the Neocatechumenal Way. Undergraduate and graduate theological studies take place at Saint Charles Borromeo Seminary.

Rhode Island
 Our Lady of Providence Seminary (Providence, Rhode Island) - Diocesan seminary; opened in 1942.

Texas
 Assumption Seminary (San Antonio) - Archdiocesan seminary; established in 1915.
 Holy Trinity Seminary (Irving) - Diocesan seminary; established in 1964.
 Oblate School of Theology (San Antonio) - Run by the Oblates of Mary Immaculate; opened in 1903.
 St. Anthony Junior Seminary (San Antonio) - Run by the Oblates of Mary Immaculate; operated from 1905 to 1995. Taken over by the University of the Incarnate Word in 1995.
 St. Charles Seminary (Texas) (El Paso) - Diocesan seminary.
 St. Mary Seminary (Houston) - Archdiocesan seminary.
 San Antonio de Padua Seminary (El Paso) - Franciscan theological seminary for Mexican province.
 Redemptoris Mater Seminary (Dallas) - Diocesan missionary seminary consisting of vocations from the Neocatechumenal Way.

Washington
 Bishop White Seminary at Gonzaga University (Spokane) - Diocesan seminary

Wisconsin
 Sacred Heart Seminary and School of Theology (Hales Corners) - Run by the Priests of the Sacred Heart; opened in 1932.
 Saint Francis de Sales Seminary (Milwaukee) - Archdiocesan seminary; opened in 1845.
 St. Lawrence Seminary High School (Mount Calvary) - Run by the Capuchin Friars; opened in 1860.

Uruguay
 Mayor Interdiocesano Cristo Rey, Montevideo

Venezuela
Seminario Mayor Santa Rosa de Lima - for the Archdiocese of Caracas

Asia/Pacific

Australia
New South Wales and Australian Capital Territory
 Good Shepherd Seminary - established at Homebush in 1996 by then Cardinal Edward Bede Clancy, is the seminary of the Archdiocese of Sydney, as well as NSW and ACT.
 Holy Spirit Seminary - established at St Mary's in the Diocese of Parramatta by Bishop Kevin Manning in 2008.
 Redemptoris Mater - seminary of the Archdiocese of Sydney for the Neocatechumenal Way.
 St Patrick's College - opened in 1889, was located at Manly. The seminary closed in 2005.
 Vianney College - established in Wagga Wagga by Bishop William Brennan in 1992.

Queensland
 Pius XII Provincial Seminary, Brisbane - closed 2001.
 Holy Spirit Seminary, Brisbane - established by the Queensland Bishops in 2007 and opened by Cardinal Levada

South Australia
 St Francis Xavier Seminary, Adelaide - closed 2001.

Victoria and Tasmania
 Corpus Christi College - established at Werribee in 1923 by Archbishop Daniel Mannix for the dioceses of Victoria, and later Tasmania as well. Moved to Glen Waverley in 1960, then to Clayton in 1973 and presently to Carlton in 2000.

Western Australia
 Redemptoris Mater - seminary of the Archdiocese of Perth for the Neo-Catechumenal Way.
 St. Charles Borromeo Seminary - established by Archbishop Barry James Hickey for the West Australian dioceses.

Bangladesh
Dhaka
 St. Joseph's Seminary - for the Roman Catholics of Bangladesh
 Holy Spirit Major Seminary - for the Roman Catholics of Bangladesh

China
Hong Kong
 Holy Spirit Seminary - for the Roman Catholic Diocese of Hong Kong

Macau
 Seminário de São José (Macau) - for the Roman Catholic Diocese of Macau

East Timor
 Seminary of Our Lady of Fatima - minor seminary, located in Dare
 Seminary of St. Joseph - minor seminary, located in Maliana
 Seminary of SS Peter and Paul - major seminary, located in Fatumeta

Fiji
 Pacific Regional Seminary of St Peter Chanel, Suva (founded 1972)

Guam

 Saint John Paul the Great Archdiocesan Seminary of Guam, Malojloj
 Redemptoris Mater (seminary) (Guam) - Archdiocesan missionary seminary consisting of vocations from the Neocatechumenal Way.

India
 Little Flower Seminary, Institute of Philosophy and Religion, Aluva - 683101, Kerala, India (Run by CST Fathers, 1961)
ST MARYS MINOR SEMINARY THRISSUR
ST MARYS MINOR SEMINARY PALAKKAD
ST ALPHONSA MINOR SEMINARY THAMARASERRY
ST JOSEPH MINOR SEMINARY THALASERY 
MSFS MINOR SEMINARY ALATTUR
BETHLEHEM MINOR SEMINARY ELENJIPARA CHALAKUDY
 Jnana-Deepa Vidyapeeth Pontifical Institution of Philosophy and Religion, Pune - Founded in 1905 and run by Jesuits.
 Mary Matha Major Seminary: Seminary is run by Syro-Malabar Catholic Archdiocese of Thrissur 
 Papal Seminary Pune - run by Jesuits.
 Divyadaan: Salesian Institute of Philosophy, Nashik - run by Salesians of Don Bosco
 Rachol Seminary - founded in 1521 for the church of Goa
 Chorão Seminary founded in 1761
 Morning Star Seminary College, Kolkata West Bengal
 Society of the Missionaries of St. Francis Xavier, Pilar - founded in 1887
 St. Aloysius Seminary, Trivandrum - minor seminary for the Syro-Malankara Archeparchy of Trivandrum
 St. John's Regional Seminary - founded in 1965 for the church of Andhra Pradesh theology
 St John's regional seminary Hyderabad philosophy
 St. Joseph's Inter-diocesan Seminary, Mangalore - first established in 1763 and later at the current location in 1879
 St. Mary's Malankara Major Seminary - center of priestly training of the Syro-Malankara Catholic Church
 St. Thomas Apostolic Seminary, Vadavathoor, Kottayam, Kerala
 St. Agnes Minor Seminary, Cuddalore, Tamil Nadu
 Good Shepherd Seminary, Coimbatore, Tamil Nadu
 St. Peter's Pontifical Institute of Philosophy and Theology (Major Seminary), Bangalore
 St. Pauls's seminary, Trichy
 St Joseph's Pontifical seminary, Mangalapuzha, Aluva syro Malabar
St Joseph Pontifical Seminary Carmalagiri Aluva Latin
Rahulaya seminary
St Paul's minor seminary irinjalakuda, 
vidyajoythi theology college Jesuits, delhi
 Dharmaram College, Major Seminary of Carmelites of Mary Immaculate, Bangalore
 Dharmaram Vidya Kshetram, Carmelites of Mary Immaculate, Pontifical Athanaeum of Philosophy Theology and Canon Law
 Good Shepherd Minor Seminary, Pala, India
 Good Shepherd Major Seminary, Kunnoth, India
 St Paul's Minor Seminary, Akalpur, Jammu
John Paul Minor Seminary Thrissur
Khrist Premalaya Ttheologicate Asta
Khrist Premalaya Philosophyate Bhopal
Satna st Ephream Seminary Syro Malabar, Madya Pradesh
St Charles seminary nagapur*
St pius seminary college mumbai
St Albert seminary college ranchi
St joseph seminary Mangalore
sadhana Kendra regional spirituality centre risda bilaspur cathisgarh
 Sacred Heart Seminary, Poonamalle, Chennai
Mary Matha Sheonstatt Minor Seminary Anathadam Alur, Thrissur
St Theresa novitiate house Kottakal Mala thrissur cmi congregation
Bethelahem minor seminary elinjipara chalakudy thrissur
Alpha institute of theology and science thalaserry kannur kerala thalassery arch diocese
Divine bible college murigoor chalakudy managed by Vincentian fathers
Sacred Heart bhavan seminary alur thrissur
Carmel Hill Philosophy College, Vazhuthacaud, Cotton Hill, Trivandrum by OCD Fathers
Carmelaram Theology College, Carmelaram P.O., Bangalore by OCD Fathers
St. Joseph's Major Seminary, Institute of Philosophy and Theology, Khammam, T.S., by HGN Congregation
Mount Carmel Petit Seminary Fortcochin, Diocese Of Cochin
Holy Cross Study House Alwaye, Diocese Of Cochin.

Indonesia
 Seminari Petrus Kanisius Mertoyudan, Mertoyudan, Magelang
 Seminari Agung Santo Paulus, Keuskupan Agung Semarang, Yogyakarta
 Seminari Menengah Wacana Bhakti, Kolese Gonzaga, Keuskupan Agung Jakarta, Jakarta
 Seminari Menengah St. Yohanes Berkhmans Todabelu-Flores, Keuskupan Agung Ende, Flores
Seminari Menengah Stella Maris, Keuskupan Bogor, Bogor, Jawa Barat
Seminari Menengah Cadas Hikmat, Keuskupan Bandung, Bandung Jawa Barat
Seminari Tinggi Fermentum, Keuskupan Bandung, Bandung, Jawa Barat
Seminari Menengah Santo Paulus Palembang, Keuskupan Agung Palembang
 Seminari Menengah Santo Petrus Aek Tolang, Keuskupan Sibolga
 Seminari Menengah Christus Sacerdos Pematangsiantar, Keuskupan Agung Medan
 Seminari Tinggi Santo Petrus Pematangsiantar, Keuskupan Agung Medan

Israel and Palestinian Territories
 The Latin Patriarchate Seminary - in Beit Jala near Jerusalem, originally opened in 1852
 Custody of the Holy Land - in Jerusalem in the Old City of Jerusalem, originally opened in 1219
(Redemptoris Mater Galilee Seminary)

Japan
 Japan Catholic Seminary - two campuses; one in the Sulpician Seminary of Fukuoka, the other in Tokyo

Kazakhstan
 Mary, Mother of the Church Seminary - Located in Maikuduk, Karaganda

Malaysia
 College General - Located in Tanjung Bungah, Penang

New Zealand
 Good Shepherd College - Auckland, founded in 2001.
 Holy Cross Seminary - Founded in Dunedin in 1900, relocated to Auckland in 1997. National Seminary for the six dioceses of New Zealand.
 Holy Name Seminary - established in Christchurch, New Zealand in 1947; closed at the end of 1978 (was staffed by the Society of Jesus).
 St Mary's Seminary - established in 1850 by New Zealand's first Catholic Bishop, Jean Baptiste François Pompallier and closed in 1869 when Pompallier left the country.
 The Marist Seminary - for the training of Marist priests. It was first opened in 1889 in Hawkes Bay and was relocated to Auckland in 1992.

Pakistan
 Christ the King Seminary - seminary in Karachi, founded in 1956
 Redemptoris Mater Missionary Seminary - Karachi, founded in 2006
 St. Francis Xavier Seminary - Lahore, founded in 1994
 St. Mary's Minor Seminary, Lahore
 Our Lady of Lourdes Minor Seminary, Islamabad-Rawalpindi, founded in 1995
 St. Pius X Minor Seminary - Karachi, founded in 1958
 St. Thomas the Apostle Minor Seminary, Faisalabad, founded in 1981

Philippines
 Our Lady of Sheshan Major Seminary of the Institute of the Incarnate Word, San Celestino, Lipa City
 Our Lady of La Salette College Seminary (Silang, Cavite)
 St. Augustine Minor Seminary-Minor Seminary of Iba, Zambales, Luzon covering Olongapo City and Zambales Province 
 Augustinian Novitiate and Prayer House (Talisay City, Cebu) - Novitiate House of the Augustinian, Province of Sto. Niño de Cebu
 Society of the Divine Savior (Salvatorians) Father Otto Hopfenmuller Formation House, [Loyola Heights, Quezon City]
Adorno Fathers Seminary (Vinzons, Camarines Norte) - Formation House Seminary of the Clerics Regular Minor Philippines
Divine Word Seminary -Tagaytay
San Jacinto Seminary (Penablanca, Cagayan) - Minor Seminary of the Archdiocese of Tuguegarao
Thomas Aquinas Major Seminary (Aparri, Cagayan) - Major Seminary of the Archdiocese of Tuguegarao
 Blessed John XXIII Seminary (Cebu City)
 Christ the King Mission Seminary (Quezon City) - run by the Divine Word Missionaries
 Cor Jesu Seminary (Dipolog)
 Father Hannibal Formation Center - Manila (Parañaque) - run by the Rogationists of the Heart of Jesus for seminarians from Luzon
 Saint Hannibal Formation Center - Cebu (Cebu City) - run by the Rogationists of the Heart of Jesus for seminarians from Visayas and Mindanao
 Diocesan Seminary of the Heart of Jesus (San Fernando La Union) - minor seminary
 Holy Rosary Seminary (Naga and San Jose, Camarines Sur) - seminary of the Archdiocese of Caceres
 Holy Trinity College Seminary (Daet, Camarines Norte) - college seminary of the Diocese of Daet
 Immaculate Conception School of Theology (Vigan, Ilocos Sur)
 Immaculate Conception Minor Seminary (Vigan, Ilocos Sur)
 Immaculate Conception Minor Seminary (Guiguinto, Bulacan) - Minor seminary of the Diocese of Malolos
 Immaculate Conception Major Seminary (Guiguinto, Bulacan) - Major seminary of the Diocese of Malolos
 Immaculate Conception Major Seminary- Graduate School of Theology (Guiguinto, Bulacan) - Graduate School of Theology of the Diocese of Malolos
 Immaculate Heart of Mary Seminary (Tagbilaran City, Bohol)
 John Paul II Minor Seminary (Antipolo, Rizal) - high school seminary of the Diocese of Antipolo
 Maradjao Magbalantay College Seminary (Surigao City, Surigao del Norte) - college seminary of the Diocese of Surigao
 Little Way College Seminary Kabankalan City, - college seminary of the Diocese of Kabankalan
 Maria Assumpta Seminary (Cabanatuan) - high school and college seminary of the Diocese of Cabanatuan
 Mary Cause of Our Joy College Seminary (Bacarra) - Major Seminary of the Diocese of Laoag
 Mary Help of Christians College Seminary (Dagupan)
 Mary Help of Christians School Seminary (Binmaley, Pangasinan)
 Mary Help of Christians Theology Seminary (San Fabian, Pangasinan)
 Mary's Children Formation College (Tungkop, Minlanilla Cebu)
 Maryhurst Seminary (Baguio)
 Mater Salutis College Seminary (Legazpi City, Albay) - college seminary of the Diocese of Legazpi
 Mission Society of the Philippines (Tagaytay, Cavite and Cebu City) - Official Missionary Arm of the Philippine Roman Catholic Church
 Mother of Good Counsel Seminary (San Fernando City, Pampanga) - seminary of the Archdiocese of San Fernando de Pampanga
 Mount Saint Aloysius College Seminary (Gumaca, Quezon) - college seminary of the Diocese of Gumaca
 The Nativity of Our Lady College Seminary (Borongan, Eastern Samar)
 Oblates of St. Joseph Major Seminary (Lipa City, Batangas)
 Oblates of St. Joseph Minor Seminary (San Jose, Batangas) - high school seminary
 Our Lady of Guadalupe Minor Seminary (Makati) - high school seminary of the Archdiocese of Manila
 Our Lady of Guadalupe Diocesan Seminary (Kidapawan City)
 Our Lady of Lourdes Seminary (Lipa City, Batangas) - (OFM Cap.) Capuchin Formation House of the Order of Friars Minor-Capuchin in the Philippines
 Our Lady of Mount Carmel Seminary (Sariaya, Quezon) - Minor Seminary, Diocese of Lucena
 Our Lady of Peace College Seminary (Tarlac City) - Diocese of Tarlac
 Our Lady of Penafrancia Seminary (Sorsogon City) - high school and college seminary of the Diocese of Sorsogon
 Our Lady of Perpetual Help Seminary (Koronadal City) - Minor Seminary, Diocese of Marbel
 Our Lady of the Angels Seminary (Quezon City) - (OFM) Franciscan College Seminary
 Our Lady of the Most Holy Rosary Seminary (Lucban, Quezon) - Major seminary, Diocese of Lucena
Our Lady of the Visitacion Seminary- Cauayan city Isabela
 Pope Paul VI Minor Seminary (Maasin City, Southern Leyte)
 Queen of Apostles College Seminary (Tagum City)
St. Francis Xavier Regional Major Seminary of Mindanao (Davao City)
 Sacred Heart Seminary - Bacolod (Bacolod)
 Sacred Heart Seminary (Palo, Leyte)
 Sancta Maria, Mater et Regina, Seminarium (Cagay, Roxas City, Capiz) - major seminary of the Archdiocese of Capiz
 Saint Albert the Great Seminary (Calamba, Laguna) - pre-novitiate house of the Order of Preachers (Dominicans) Philippine Province
 Saint Alphonsus Regional Seminary (Lucena City, Quezon) - Theologate Degree, Diocese of Lucena
 St. Anthony High School Seminary (Masbate)
 Saint Anthony Mary Claret Seminary (Culiat, Quezon City) - College Seminary of the Claretian Missionaries in the Philippines and Vietnam
 San Antonio Maria Claret House (Tandang Sora, Quezon City) - Theology house of the Claretian Missionaries
 Saint Augustine Senior-Major Seminary (Tagaytay, Cavite) - seminary of the Apostolic Vicariate of Calapan
 St. Camillus College Seminary (Marikina)
 Saint Francis de Sales Minor Seminary (Lipa City, Batangas) - Minor (High School) Seminary of the Archdiocese of Lipa
 Saint Francis de Sales Institute of Formation (Marawoy, Lipa City, Batangas) - Pre-College Seminary of the Archdiocese of Lipa
 Saint Francis de Sales Major Seminary (Marawoy, Lipa City, Batangas) - Major (College) Seminary of the Archdiocese of Lipa
 Saint Francis de Sales Theological Seminary (Marawoy, Lipa City, Batangas)- Theology Seminary of the Archdiocese of Lipa
 St. Francis Xavier Seminary (Baguio)
St. Francis Xavier College Seminary (Davao City)
 St. Gregory the Great Seminary (Panal, Tabaco City); Celebrating 50 years in Panal 2–3 September 2010. Minor Seminary for the Diocese of Legazpi
 St. John Evangelist School of Theology - seminary of the Archdiocese of Palo, Leyte
 St. John Ma. Vianney Formation House (Antipolo)
 St. John the Baptist the Precursor Seminary (Marikina)
 St. John Vianney Theological Seminary (Cagayan de Oro)
 St. Joseph Major Seminary (Infanta)
 St. Joseph Pre-College Seminary (Alaminos, Pangasinan)
 St. Joseph Seminary (Bangued, Abra)
 Saint Joseph Seminary (Dumaguete, Negros Oriental)
 St. Joseph Seminary (Ipil)
 Saint Joseph Regional Seminary (Jaro, Iloilo City) - Major Seminary of the Archdiocese of Jaro
 Saint Joseph Seminary (Puerto Princesa City, Palawan)
 St. Mary's Seminary (Laoag City, Ilocos Norte) - Minor Seminary of the Diocese of Laoag
 Sto. Nino Seminary (Numancia, Aklan) - minor and college
 St. Paul Seminary Foundation (Silang, Cavite)
 St. Peter College Seminary (Butuan)
 St. Peter's Seminary (Mountain Province)
 St. Pius X Seminary (Lawaan, Roxas City, Capiz) - minor seminary of the Archdiocese of Capiz
 St. Therese Pre-College Seminary (Mati City, Davao Oriental)
 St. Vincent de Paul College Seminary (Calbayog, Samar)
 Saint Vincent Ferrer Seminary - (Jaro, Iloilo City) - Minor Seminary of the Archdiocese of Jaro
 Seminario Mayor de San Carlos (Mabolo, Cebu City)
 San Carlos Seminary (Makati) - the Royal and Conciliar major seminary of the Archdiocese of Manila
 San Agustin Center of Studies (Quezon City, Philippines) - Theology Seminary of the Augustinian, Province of Sto. Niño de Cebu
 San Agustin Seminary (Guadalupe Viejo, Makati) - Late Vocations Seminary of the Augustinian, Province of Sto. Niño de Cebu
 San Carlos Seminary College (Cebu City)
 San Jose de Mindanao College Seminary (Cagayan de Oro)
 San Jose Seminary (Katipunan, Quezon City) - Jesuit-run seminary for diocesan priests; in Ateneo de Manila University
 San Lorenzo Ruiz Seminary (Odiongan, Romblon)
 San Pablo Seminary (Baguio) - major seminary (regional philosophy seminary of Northern Luzon)
 Seminario de San Jose (Puerto Princesa City, Palawan) - minor and major seminary
 Seminario de Jesus Nazareno (Borongan, Eastern Samar)
 Seminario Mayor Recoletos (Baguio)
 University of Santo Tomas Central Seminary - Dominican-run inter-diocesan seminary of the Philippines, found within the vicinity of the University of Santo Tomas in Manila
 Vincent Hills Seminary (Angono, Rizal)
 Don Bosco Prenovitiate Seminary (Canlubang, Calamba, Laguna)
 Don Bosco Sacred Heart Posnovitiate Seminary (Canlubang, Calamba, Laguna)
 Seminaryo ng Don Bosco (Parañaque)
 Sons of Holy Mary Immaculate (Parañaque)
 Society of the Divine Savior (Salvatorians) Father Jordan Formation House, [Amadeo, Cavite]
 Society of the Divine Savior (Salvatorians) Mater Salvatoris Theologate House, [New Manila, Quezon City]
 Pastor Bonus Seminary (Archdiocese of Zamboanga) Tetuan, Zamboanga City

Solomon Islands
 Holy Name of Mary Seminary, Tenaru, Guadalcanal Province. Inter-diocesan seminary founded in 1995.

Singapore
 St Francis Xavier Major Seminary, - founded in 1983

South Korea
At the end of the year 2011, there are 7 major seminaries in Korea; and the number of seminarians in these seven seminaries is 1,587 — from diocesan 1,317, religious & missionary 270.

 College of Theology, Catholic University of Korea - founded in 1855, currently located on the Songsin campus of Seoul; 'Songsin' means Holy Spirit in Korean.
 Department of Theology, Gwangju Catholic University, - founded in 1962, second oldest in Korea
 College of Theology, Catholic University of Daegu - founded by the Archdiocese of Daegu
 Department of Theology, Catholic University of Pusan - also running the College of Nursing
 Department of Theology, Daejeon Catholic University
 Department of Theology, Incheon Catholic University - founded in 1995, also running the College of Religious Arts
 Department of Theology, Suwon Catholic University - founded in 1982

Thailand
There are numerous minor seminaries and one major seminary:
 Saengtham College, or Lux Mundi Major Seminary, in Sam Phran District, Nakhon Pathom Province.

Vietnam
There are 8 major seminaries with 1,480 students in Vietnam.
Saint Joseph Major Seminary of Hanoi - Major Seminary of the Archdiocese of Hanoi
Vinh Thanh Major Seminary - Major Seminary in Vinh
Saint Sulpice Major Seminary of Hue (Xuân Bích Major Seminary) - Major Seminary of the Archdiocese of Huế
Maris Stella Major Seminary (Sao Biển Major Seminary) - Major Seminary in Nha Trang
Saint Joseph Major Seminary of Saigon - Major Seminary of the Archdiocese of Ho Chi Minh City
Saint Joseph Major Seminary of Xuan Loc - Major Seminary of the Diocese of Xuân Lôc
Saint Quí Major Seminary (Thánh Quí Major Seminary) - Major Seminary in Cần Thơ
Immaculate Conception Major Seminary Bui Chu (Đức Mẹ Vô Nhiễm Major Seminary of Bùi Chu) - Major Seminary of Diocese of Bùi Chu
And some minor seminaries:
Sacred Heart Seminary of Thai Binh - Minor Seminary of the Diocese of Thái Bình
Saint Nicolas Seminary of Phan Thiet - Minor Seminary of the Diocese of Phan Thiết

Europe

Albania
 Albanian Pontifical Seminary, Shkodër; Jesuit

Austria
 Collegium Canisianum - International seminary run by the Jesuits, in Innsbruck
 Priesterseminar Erzdiözese Salzburg - founded in 1699; for the Archdiocese of Salzburg
 Seminary of Vienna - founded in 1758; for the Archdiocese of Wien
 Priesterseminar Leopoldinum - founded in 1967, located in Heiligenkreuz bei Baden

Belarus
 Grodno Major Seminary, Inter-diocesan seminary in Grodno, founded in 1990.
 St. Thomas Aquinas Major Seminary in Pinsk, since 2001.

Belgium
 John XXIII Seminary, Leuven - the Dutch-speaking major seminary.
 Séminaire Notre-Dame in Namur - the French-speaking major seminary.
 Notre-Dame de la Strada, - formation house in Brussels for the Archdiocese of Paris.
 Redemptoris Mater Seminary Namur, International Diocesan Missionary Seminary for the Neocatechumenal Way in Namur.
 Redemptoris Mater Seminary Mechelen-Brussels, seminary for the Neocatechumenal Way in Limelette.

No longer trains seminarians:
 Major Seminary, Bruges, Bruges - closed in 2018 and students moved to Johannes XXIII Seminary in Leuven.
 St. Joseph Minor Seminary; former minor seminary of the Diocese of Ghent, now a mixed secondary school.
 Major Seminary of Ghent: major seminary of the Diocese of Ghent until 2002.
 Diocesan Seminary of Liège - moved seminarians to Namur.
 Séminaire de Tournai - Diocese of Tournai, moved seminarians to Namur.
 Séminaire Saint-Paul, in Louvain-la-Neuve - moved seminarians to Namur.
 American College of the Immaculate Conception, Leuven - closed in 2011 by the United States Conference of Catholic Bishops.

Bosnia and Herzegovina
Roman Catholic Archdiocese of Vrhbosna; major seminary
Roman Catholic Archdiocese of Vrhbosna; minor seminary
International Diocese missionary seminary Redemptoris Mater, Sarajevo; Neochatecumenal Way

Croatia
Archdiocesan Classical Gymnasium - with minor seminary, located in Zagreb
 Greek Catholic Seminary in Zagreb
Roman Catholic Archdiocese of Rijeka; major seminary
Roman Catholic Archdiocese of Zagreb; major seminary
Roman Catholic Archdiocese of Split; major seminary
Roman Catholic Archdiocese of Đakovo-Osijek; major seminary
International Diocese missionary seminary Redemptoris Mater, Pula; Neochatecumenal Way

Czech Republic
 Saints Cyril and Methodius Faculty of Theology, located in Olomouc (1566-1939,1945–1950,1990-now), Litoměřice (1968–1974).
 Arcibiskupský seminář v Praze Archbishops' Seminary in Prague.
 Teologická fakulta Jihočeské univerzity Seminary - since 1991, formerly centred in České Budějovice Seminary until 1950.
 Redemptoris Mater International Diocesan Missionary Seminary in České Budějovice by the Neocatechumenal Way since 2018.

France

 Diocesan Seminary of Saint-Luc d'Aix en Provence, founded by the Archdiocese of Aix.
 Séminaire de Bayonne founded by the Diocese of Bayonne, Lescar and Oloron
 Séminaire de La Castille, founded by the Diocese of Fréjus-Toulon
 Séminaire Saint-Irénée, founded by the Archdiocese of Lyon
 Grand Séminaire de Metz, which houses the Lorraine Major Inter-diocesan Seminary, founded in 1745 by the Diocese of Metz.
 Séminaire d'Orléans, inter-diocesan seminary in Orléans 
 Grand séminaire Saint Jean, inter-diocesan seminary in Nantes.
 Notre Dame Faculty, also known as the Collège des Bernardins, founded in 1984 for the Archdiocese of Paris.
 Séminaire des Carmes, Institut Catholique de Paris, founded in 1919.
 Grand Séminaire Saint Sulpice, inter-diocesan seminary run by the Sulpicians in Issy-les-Moulineaux, outside Paris.
 Séminaire Saint Yves, founded by the Archdiocese of Rennes.
 Grand Séminaire Sainte Marie Majeure de Strasbourg, founded by the Archdiocese of Strasbourg
 Séminaire Saint Cyprien de Toulouse, founded by the Archdiocese of Toulouse.
 Grand séminaire de Versailles, founded by the Diocese of Versailles.
 Community of Saint Martin a training center at Évron, Mayenne.

Closed:

 Bayeux seminary, for the Diocese of Bayeux, closed in 1969.
 Grand séminaire de Besançon - for the Archdiocese of Besançon.
 St Joseph Seminary, Bordeaux, founded by the Archdiocese of Bordeaux closed in 2019.
 Saint Jean-Eudes Seminary in Caens, closed 2015.
 Lilles Seminary, for the Archdiocese of Lille, closed in 2018.
 Limoges Seminary, closed in 1958.
 Rouen Seminary, succeeded Séminaire de Saint-Vivien for the Archdiocese of Rouen.

Germany
By main Ecclesiastical Provinces:

Berlin
 Priesterseminar Berlin - for the Archdiocese of Berlin
 Priesterseminar Redemptoris Mater - Seminary of the Neocatechumenal Way in Berlin

Cologne
 Collegium Albertinum - located in Bonn; for the Archdiocese of Cologne
 Priesterseminar Köln - for the Archdiocese of Cologne
 Sankt Georgen Graduate School of Philosophy and Theology - founded in 1926 by the Jesuits, in Frankfurt am Main; notable graduates include Cardinal Friedrich Wetter
 Studienhaus St. Lambert - interdiocesan seminary, located in Lantershofen, near Bonn
 Priesterseminar Trier - for the Diocese of Trier

Freiburg im Breisgau
 Priesterseminar Collegium Borromaeum - for the Archdiocese of Freiburg
 Priesterseminar St. Bonifatius Mainz - for the Diocese of Mainz

Hamburg
 Priesterseminar Hamburg - for the Archdiocese of Hamburg

Munich und Freising
 Priesterseminar München (Priesterseminar St. Johannes der Täufer) - for the Archdiocese of Munich and Freising; founded in 1983
 Ducal Georgianum - in Munich
 Priesterseminar Regensburg (Priesterseminar St. Wolfgang Regensburg) - for the Diocese of Regensburg; founded in 1653
 Priesterseminar St. Hieronymus Augsburg - for the diocese of Augsburg
 Wigratzbad - Formally known as the International Seminary of St. Peter (ISSP; Internationales Priesterseminar St. Petrus); the headquarters of the Priestly Fraternity of St. Peter, located in Wigratzbad-Opfenbach in the Diocese of Augsburg, Bavaria

Paderborn
 Collegium Leoninum (Paderborn) - In Paderborn; founded by pope Leo XIII for the Archdiocese of Paderborn
 Priesterseminar Paderborn - for the Archdiocese of Paderborn
 Priesterseminar Erfurt - for former dioceses of the GDR: Berlin, Dresden-Meissen, Erfurt, Magdeburg and Görlitz

Other
 Collegium Orientale in Eichstätt

Hungary
 Central Institute for Priestly Education, Budapest.
 Eger College of Theology founded by the Archdiocese of Eger.
 Esztergom Seminary, originally housed in the Ószeminárium, founded by the Archdiocese of Esztergom-Budapest.
 János Brenner Theological College or Győr Theological College, founded by the Diocese of Győr.
 St. Gellert Seminary, founded by the Diocese of Szeged–Csanád.
 Blessed Gizella Seminary, housed in Archbishop's Theological College of Veszprém, founded by Archdiocese of Veszprém.
 St. Athanasius Greek Catholic Theological College founded by Hungarian Catholic Eparchy of Nyíregyháza

Ireland
The Catholic Church in Ireland encompasses the entire island of Ireland, including the distinct political entities the Republic of Ireland and Northern Ireland. There are two active diocesan seminaries in Ireland:
 St Patrick's College, Maynooth - national seminary for Ireland, established in 1795. Capacity for 500 seminarians; there were 35 in 2018.
 Redemptoris Mater Archdiocesan Missionary Seminary, Dundalk. Seminary for the Archdiocese of Armagh run under the auspices of the Neocatechumenal Way. In 2017 it was training 16 seminarians from eight countries.
 St. Saviour’s Priory, Dublin, the Dominicans moved their studium from St. Mary's Priory in Tallaght, in 2000, students complete their studies in Rome.

The remaining diocesan seminaries are closed:
 All Hallows College was founded in 1842 for training priests for foreign dioceses. Closed in 2015. Now DCU All Hallows Campus.
 Clonliffe College (Holy Cross College), for the Archdiocese of Dublin was founded in 1859, opened in 1861 and closed as a seminary in June 2000. 
 Mungret College, Limerick, was a Limerick diocesan seminary until 1888 and a Jesuit school from 1882 until 1974. 
 St Finbarr's College, Farranferris, Cork, was the minor seminary for the Diocese of Cork and Ross, it closed in 2006.
 St. Brendan's College, Killarney - secondary school founded in 1860 which also prepared seminarians for the priesthood.
 St. Finian's College was founded in Navan as the Meath Diocesan College in 1802. It is now a boys secondary school.
 St. John's College, Waterford, founded in 1807, was exclusively for seminarians of the Waterford and Lismore Diocese from 1873 until June 1999.
 St Kieran's College, Kilkenny, was founded in 1782, priestly formation was discontinued in 1994.
 St Malachy's College, Belfast, founded in 1833 for the Diocese of Down and Connor, closed in 2018.
 St. Patrick's, Carlow College was founded in 1782, opened in 1793. From 1892 it was only a seminary. In the 1990s, priestly formation was discontinued.
 St. Patrick's College, Thurles opened in 1837, exclusively a seminary from 1907 to 1988, ceased to function as a seminary in 2002.
 St Peter's College, Wexford was founded in 1811, seminary closed in 1999.
 St Vincent's Seminary, Cork once trained priests, later became a secondary school.
Religious congregations also had houses of formation in Ireland:
 Franciscan Novitiate, Killarney, Co. Kerry. Built in 1860, students were then sent to St. Anthony's in Galway.
 St Anthony's College, Newcastle, Galway. Former Franciscan seminary, buildings now used by NUI Galway.
 Belmont House, Stillorgan, Dublin. Novitiate of the Oblates, founded near Glenmary, near Delgany in Co. Wicklow, moved in 1863.
 Belcamp Hall, Raheny, was the juniorate of the Missionary Oblates of Mary Immaculate.
 Bessborough House Oblates Our Lady's Scholasticate in Piltown Co. Kilkenny, from 1941 to 1971. Building now used as Kildalton Agricultural College.
 Our Lady of Lourdes, Cahermoyle, Ardagh, Co. Limerick, Oblate junior novitiate
 Moyne Park, Abbeyknocknoy, Ballyglunin, Co. Galway, in 1909 opened as a Camillian hospice, a seminary for the Missionaries of the Sacred Heart in 1936, closed in the early 1970s. was the home of Declan Ganley, Donovan and George MacBeth until his death in 1992.
 Dalgan House, Shrule, Co. Mayo. Built in 1801, and bought by the Duke of Bedford in 1853, it was a seminary for the Columbans in 1918 until 1941. It is now demolished.
 St Columbans College, Dalgan Park, Navan, was the seminary of the Columbans after 1941.
 St Patrick's, Donamon Castle, County Roscommon. Novitiate of the Divine Word Missionaries, opened 1939, closed in 1980.
 Kilshane, County Tipperary. Novitiate of Holy Ghost Fathers (the Spiritians), was purchased in August 1933 and opened as a Novitiate for both clerics and brothers.
 Holy Ghost Missionary College, Kimmage Manor, Dublin. Formation house of the Holy Ghost Fathers (the Spiritians) for those going on to Kilshane.
 Legion of Christ Novitiate, Leopardstown Road, Foxrock, Dublin. In April 1960, it opened in Bundoran, County Donegal. On 3 June 1962, it moved to Hazelbrook House, Malahide, to Foxrock in 1968 and closed in September 2011.
 Kinury, near Westport, Co. Mayo, was given to the Society of African Missions (SMA) in 1914 by Miss Sofia Crotty. It was used as a novitiate and closed in 1924.
Cloghballymore House, Ballinderreen, Kilcolgan, Co. Galway, was a tower house, then a country estate. In 1906, Count Llewellyn Blake owned it and gave it to the Society of the African Missions and was their novitiate from 1924 until the mid 1970s. Since 1981, it has been a nursing home.
Ballinafad Minor Seminary was also given by Count Llewellyn Blake to the Society of the African Missions, operated until 1975 and was linked to Cloghballymore House.
 St Joseph's Seminary, Blackrock Rd, Cork. The original seminary of the Society of the African Missions, later transferred to Dromantine House.
 Dromantine House, Newry Co. Down, was a seminary of the Society of the African Missions from 1926 until 1972.
 St Augustine's College (Loughan House), Blacklion, Co. Cavan. Novitiate of the White Fathers from September 1955 and closed in 1970.
 Coláiste Mhuire, Marino, Dublin. Teacher Training Centre of the Irish Christian Brothers.
 St. Helen's, Booterstown, Dublin. Headquarters and novitiate of the Irish Christian Brothers, 1925 until 1988. Now a hotel.
 The Abbey, Loughrea, Co. Galway. Since 1645, it had a community of Discalced Carmelites, and trained novices since 1664. In 1882, a new novitiate was constructed, and extended in 1934. The novitiate is closed, but a community remains. 
 Castlemartyr, Co. Cork, in 1930, had a Discalced Carmelite juniorate. It closed in 1996 and is now a hotel.
Loughrea, Co. Galway, contained a novitiate of the De La Salle Brothers, which was active into the 1980s.
 Faithlegg House, County Waterford. In 1935, it was sold to the De La Salle religious institute by the Power family. It was a novitiate until the 1980s. It is now Faithlegg House Hotel.
 St Stanislaus College, Tullabeg, Tullamore. This was the novitiate of the Jesuits in Ireland until the move to Emo Court in 1930.
 St Mary's, Emo Court. Novitiate for the Society of Jesus in Ireland from 1930 to 1969.
 Manresa House, Dollymount, Dublin. After Emo Court, it was novitiate of the Irish Jesuits from 1969 to 1991. It now has the English-speaking Tertianship for Europe.
 Milltown Institute of Theology and Philosophy formed out of the Jesuit Theology Faculty, with the National University of Ireland validating its academic programmes.
 St Patrick's, Esker, Athenry, Co. Galway. Established on 18 August 1901 and until 1936 it was the Redemptorist Irish Province major seminary. From 1948 until 1969 it was the novitiate. In 1971, it became a retreat house.
 Cluain Mhuire, Galway, was a Redemptorist seminary, closed in the 1970s. It is now the GMIT Art College.
 Pallotine College Thurles, Co. Tipperary. Founded by the Pallotines in 1907, from 1909 to 1986 priests from the college would have studied at the nearby St. Patrick's College, Thurles.
 St Gabriel's, The Graan, Enniskillen, Co. Fermanagh. Novitiate of the Passionists, 1909–1976, is now a nursing home, although a community of Passionists remain onsite.
 Tobar Mhuire, Crossgar, Co. Down, (formerly Crossgar House). From 1950 until 1976, was the Passionist Juniorate, then a novitiate and as of February 2010, it is a Retreat and Conference Centre.
 St Paul's Retreat, Mount Argus, Dublin, was the Irish Passionist headquarters, and provided the final two years of formation for Passionist seminarians.
 Tanagh, Cootehill, Co. Cavan. Former Congregation of the Sacred Hearts of Jesus and Mary novitiate and seminary, now an outdoor education centre, and religious community remain.
 Mount St Marys, Milltown, Dublin. Seminary of the Marist Fathers. The site is now a Montessori College and the Irish Marist administrative headquarters.
Orlagh, Knocklyon, Co. Dublin. Opened as a novitiate for the Augustinians, it remained a student house until the late 1980s, when it became a retreat centre and closed in 2016
 Carmelite Friary Kinsale Co. Cork. Became a novitiate for the Irish Province of the Carmelites in 1917, moving to the existing Friary from Dublin in 1917. In 2003, due to dwindling numbers of novices, it was re-purposed as a Retreat and Spirituality Centre.
Colaiste Chiarain, a Christian Brothers Novitiate, was at Rathmicheal in south Dublin.
 Carmelite Centre, Gort Mhuire, Ballinteer, Co. Dublin, Ireland. From 1949, Gort Mhuire was the novitiate for the order and the theologate for the Carmelites, in 1968 Carmelites began studying theology in Milltown Park as the Institute was being set up there. Now the Carmelite Institute of Britain and Ireland is based here.
St. Joseph's, Blackrock, was the seminary for the Vincentians, was founded in 1930, St. Kevins, House of Studies/Seminary, Glenart, Arklow, operated from 1948 to 1968, when students were transferred back to Blackrock in 1977, until the setting up of DePaul House, Celbridge operated from 1977 to 1988.
Myross Woods, Leap, Co Cork was the novitate of the Missionaries of the Sacred Heart. Converted to a retreat centre in the 1970s, it closed in 2021.

Italy

The list includes some seminaries by principal Ecclesiastical Provinces.

Benevento
 Seminario Arcivescovile di Benevento - founded in 1567; for the Archdiocese of Benevento, closed in 2018, students transferred to the Pontifical Campanian Interregional Seminary.

Catania
 Seminary of Acireale - founded in 1881; for the Diocese of Acireale, in Sicily

Florence
 Episcopal Seminary of Fiesole - founded in 1637 for the Diocese of Fiesole
 Institute of Christ the King Sovereign Priest - founded in 1990; international seminary located in Gricigliano, near Florence
 Seminario Maggiore Arcivescovile di Firenze - founded in 1712; for the Archdiocese of Florence
 Seminario Vescovile di Fiesole - founded in 1637; for the Diocese of Fiesole
 Seminario Vescovile di Pistoia - founded in 1783; for the Diocese of Pistoia
 Seminario vescovile di San Miniato - for the Diocese of San Miniato

Genoa
 Seminario Arcivescovile di Genova - founded in 1962; for the Archdiocese of Genoa
 Seminario Vescovile di Savona - for the Diocese of Savona

Lecce
 Seminario Arcivescovile di Brindisi - founded in 1720; for the Archdiocese of Brindisi, closed in 2017.

Messina
 Seminario vescovile di Patti - for the Diocese of Patti

Milan
 Seminario vescovile di Bergamo 
 Seminario arcivescovile di Milano - founded in 1564; for the Archdiocese of Milan
 Seminario Diocesano di Pavia - founded in 1799; for the Diocese of Pavia
 Seminario maggiore di Como - for the Diocese of Como

Naples
 San Luigi Papal Theological Seminary of Southern Italy (Pontificia Facoltà Teologica dell'Italia Meridionale ; PFTIM) - located in Naples
 Seminario Arcivescovile di Napoli - founded in 1930; for the Archdiocese of Naples

Pisa
 Seminario Girolamo Gavi - founded in 1851; for the Diocese of Livorno

Rome

 Pontificio Collegio Leoniano - founded in 1897, located in Anagni
 Pontificio Collegio Nepomuceno - founded in 1884, located in Rome
 Pontifical North American College - founded in 1859, located in Rome; the North American College was granted pontifical status placing it under the special patronage of the Apostolic See and the care of the Pope. The college, therefore, is the direct concern of the Congregation for Catholic Education and is under the immediate supervision of the United States Conference of Catholic Bishops.
 Pontifical Roman Seminary (Pontificio Seminario Romano Maggiore) - founded in 1565, located at the Basilica of St. John Lateran in Rome
 Seminario della Fraternità Sacerdotale dei Missionari di San Carlo Borromeo - founded in the 20th century
 The Center for Higher Studies - run by the Legion of Christ for its own members.
 The Venerable English college - founded in 1579 by Pope Gregory XIII and William Cardinal Allen with the desire to send priests back to minister to Catholics in England after the reformation
 The Pontifical Scots College - founded 5 December 1600 by Pope Clement VIII.
 Pontifical Irish College

Salerno-Campagna-Acerno
 Seminario Vescovile di Teggiano - founded in 1564; for the Roman Catholic Diocese of Teggiano-Policastro

Taranto
 Seminario Arcivescovile di Taranto - founded in 1568; for the Archdiocese of Taranto

Torino
 Seminario Vescovile di Asti - founded in 1574; for the Diocese of Asti

Venice
 Seminario maggiore di Padova - founded in 1566; for the Diocese of Padua
 Seminario vescovile (Vicenza) - founded in 1566; for the Diocese of Vicenza

Latvia
 Rīgas Katoļu garīgais seminārs - Latvian Inter-Diocesan Theological Seminary in Riga.

Lithuania
 Kaunas Priest Seminary - The largest seminary in Lithuania serving the Roman Catholic Archdiocese of Kaunas
 Telsiai Bishop Vincentas Borisevicius Priest Seminary - Located in Telšiai
 Vilnius St. Joseph Seminary - For the dioceses of Vilnius, Panevėžys and Kaišiadorys.

Luxembourg
 Grand Séminaire de Luxembourg - Founded in 1845; for the Archdiocese of Luxembourg

Netherlands
Many serve as residences for courses that take place elsewhere:
 Ariëns Institute (Het Ariënsinstituut) in the centre of Utrecht, run by the Archdiocese of Utrecht.
 Rolduc in Kerkrade of the southeastern Netherlands; run by the Diocese of Roermond
 St Willibrord Seminary, run by the Diocese of Haarlem-Amsterdam
 St John's Centre run by the Diocese of 's-Hertogenbosch
 Bovendonk Seminary, for part-time study and later vocations, run by the Diocese of Breda
 Vronesteyn Seminary in Voorburg, run by the Diocese of Rotterdam.
 Redemptoris Mater Haarlem-Amsterdam, International Diocesan Missionary Major Seminary, in Nieuwe Niedorp for the Neocatechumenal Way
 Redemptoris Mater Seminary near  in Cadier en Keer, for the Neocatechumenal Way.

Norway
 St. Eystein presteseminar, Oslo - Established March 1, 2006. For the Roman Catholic Diocese of Oslo.

Poland
 - for the Archdiocese of Warmia
 - for the Archdiocese of Warsaw
 Higher Seminary of Our Lady Victorious Diocese of Warszawa-Praga -  for the Roman Catholic Diocese of Warszawa-Praga
 - for the Archdiocese of Częstochowa
 Prymasowskie Wyższe Seminarium Duchowne w Gnieźnie - founded in 1583; for the Archdiocese of Gniezno
 Wyższe Seminarium Duchowne w Katowicech - founded in 1924; for the Archdiocese of Katowice
 Wyższe Seminarium Duchowne Archidiecezji Krakowskiej - founded in 1601; for the Archdiocese of Kraków
 Wyższe Seminarium Duchowne w Łodzi - founded in 1921; for the Archdiocese of Łódź
 Metropolitalne Seminarium Duchowne w Lublinie - for the Archdiocese of Lublin
 Wyższe Seminarium Duchowne w Opolu - founded in 1949; for the Roman Catholic Diocese of Opole and Roman Catholic Diocese of Gliwice
 Arcybiskupie Seminarium Duchowne w Poznaniu - founded in 1564; for the Archdiocese of Poznań
 Metropolitalne Wyższe Seminarium Duchowne we Wrocławiu - founded in 1947; for the Archdiocese of Wroclaw
 Wyższe Seminarium Duchowne w Paradyżu - founded in 1952; for the Roman Catholic Diocese of Zielona Góra-Gorzów

Portugal
 Seminário dos Passionistas - located in Barroselas of northern Portugal
 Seminário de Santa Joana Princesa - for the diocese of Aveiro
 Seminário Conciliar de São Pedro e São Paulo - for the Archdiocese of Braga
 Seminário dos Olivais - founded in 1931; for the Archdiocese of Lisbon
 Seminário de Caparide - for the Archdiocese of Lisbon
 Seminário Maior do Porto - for the diocese of Porto
 Seminário de São José de Vila Viçosa - for the Archdiocese of Évora
 Seminário Episcopal de Angra - for the diocese of Angra do Heroismo, Azores

Romania
 Seminary of the Wisdom Incarnate in Alba Iulia, founded in 1753, serving the Archdiocese of Alba Iulia and the Dioceses of Satu Mare, Oradea and Timişoara.
 Seminary of St. Joseph in Iaşi, founded in 1886, for the Diocese of Iaşi and the Archdiocese of Bucharest.

Russia
 Saint Petersburg Roman Catholic Theological Academy - Mary Queen of the Apostles Seminary in St. Petersburg

Slovakia

 Kňazský seminár sv. Cyrila a Metoda in Bratislava - for the Archdiocese of Bratislava and Archdiocese of Trnava
 Kňazský seminár sv. Gorazda in Nitra - for the Diocese of Nitra and the Diocese of Žilina
 Kňazský seminár biskupa Jána Vojtaššáka in Spišská Kapitula - for the Diocese of Spiš 
 Kňazský seminár sv. Karola Boromejského in Košice - for the Archdiocese of Košice and the Diocese of Rožňava

Closed:
 Kňazský seminár sv. Františka Xaverského in Banská Bystrica - for the Diocese of Banská Bystrica, until 2019, seminarians moved to Nitra.

Slovenia
 Theological Seminary of Ljubljana - known for Semenišče; famous for beautiful baroque style library, near Ljubljana cathedral

Spain
Spain has 77 seminaries.
 Asidonia-Jerez Seminary - for the Asidonia-Jerez Diocese
 Seminario mayor de Barcelona - for the Archdiocese of Barcelona
 Seminario de Málaga - for the Diocese of Málaga
 Seminario Mayor San José - for the Archdiocese of Burgos
 Seminario Mayor Metropolitano del San Cecilio - for the Archdiocese of Granada
 Seminario Conciliar de la INMACULADA Y SAN DAMASO - for the Archdiocese of Madrid
 Seminario Mayor Nuestra Señora de la Asuncion - for the Archdiocese of Oviedo
 Seminario Mayor Compostelano - for the Archdiocese of Santiago de Compostela
 Royal Scots College - Seminary in Salamanca, for the church in Scotland
 Seminario Metropolitano de Sevilla - for the Archdiocese of Seville
 Seminario Mayor San Ildefonso - for the Archdiocese of Toledo
 Seminario Metropolitano la Inmaculada - for the Archdiocese of Valencia
 English College, Valladolid (Real y Pontifico Colegio de los Nobles Ingleses de San Albano) - for the Church in England and Wales, currently providing propadeutic formation
 Seminario Mayor San Valero y San Braulio - for the Archdiocese of Zaragoza
 Seminario de Valderas (León) - for the Diocese of León
 Seminario Mayor Interdiocesano de Cataluña. Barcelona, España.

Sweden
 Sankt Sigfrids prästseminarium, Uppsala

Switzerland
 Priesterseminar St. Beat, founded by the Diocese of Basel, in Luzern.
 Priesterseminar St. Luzi - affiliated with the Theologische Hochschule Chur, for the Diocese of Chur.
 Séminaire de Sion, for the Diocese of Sion, in Givisiez, Fribourg.
 Séminaire diocésain de Lausanne, Genève et Fribourg for the Diocese of Lausanne, Geneva and Fribourg, in Villars-sur-Glâne, Fribourg.
 Seminario Diocesano San Carlo, founded by the Diocese of Lugano.

United Kingdom
The current active major seminaries of the United Kingdom are in England.

 England
 St Mary's College, Oscott - The seminary of the Province of Birmingham.
 Allen Hall Seminary, London - The seminary of the Province of Westminster.
 Redemptoris Mater House of Formation, London -  situated close to Allen Hall, for the Neocatechumenal Way.

Closed:
 Campion House, Osterley, seminary for late vocations run by the Society of Jesus
 Cotton College, minor seminary for Oscott College
 St John's Seminary, Wonersh, seminary of the Province of Southwark, closed in 2021.
 St Joseph Seminary, Mark Cross, minor seminary for St John's Seminary, Wonersh
 St Hugh's College, Tollerton, minor seminary for the Diocese of Nottingham
 St Joseph's College, Upholland, seminary for the North West of England
 Ushaw College, Durham, seminary for the Province of Liverpool, closed in 2011
 St Edmund's College, Ware, predecessor of Allen Hall

 Scotland
 Aquhorthies College, seminary for the Lowland District, replaced Scalan College merged with Lismore seminary to form Blairs College in 1829
 Blairs College, closed in 1986
 Gillis College, replaced St Andrew's College, Drygrange in 1986, replaced by Scotus College in 1993
 Lismore Seminary, for the Highland District, merged with Aquhorthies College to form Blair College in 1829
 Scalan College, from 1717 to 1799, for the Lowland District, replaced by Aquhorthies College
 Scotus College, became the National Seminary for Scotland in 1993, closed in 2009.
 St Andrew's College, Drygrange, closed in 1986
 St Peter's College, Bearsden, for the Archdiocese of Glasgow from 1874 to 1946 when it burnt down in a fire
 St Peter's Seminary, Cardross, replaced St Peter's College, Bearsden, closed in 1980.
 St Vincent College, Langbank, a minor seminary from 1961 to 1978.

 Wales
 St Mary's College, Aberystwyth, originally in Holywell, moved to Aberystwyth in 1936, closed in 1970, for Welsh-speaking training, run by the Carmelites

See also
List of Eastern Catholic seminaries
Pontifical university

References

Further reading
 Michal Kramarek, Thomas Gaunt, and Santiago Sordo-Palacios. 2017. "Directory of Catholic Seminaries: Part I General Overview". Washington, DC: Center for Applied Research in the Apostolate. 
 Michal Kramarek, Thomas Gaunt, and Santiago Sordo-Palacios. 2017. "Directory of Catholic Seminaries: Part II Africa". Washington, DC: Center for Applied Research in the Apostolate. 
 Michal Kramarek, Thomas Gaunt, and Santiago Sordo-Palacios. 2017. "Directory of Catholic Seminaries: Part III Central America". Washington, DC: Center for Applied Research in the Apostolate. 
 Michal Kramarek, Thomas Gaunt, and Santiago Sordo-Palacios. 2017. "Directory of Catholic Seminaries: Part IV North America". Washington, DC: Center for Applied Research in the Apostolate. 
 Michal Kramarek, Thomas Gaunt, and Santiago Sordo-Palacios. 2017. "Directory of Catholic Seminaries: Part V South America". Washington, DC: Center for Applied Research in the Apostolate. 
 Michal Kramarek, Thomas Gaunt, and Santiago Sordo-Palacios. 2017. "Directory of Catholic Seminaries: Part VI Asia". Washington, DC: Center for Applied Research in the Apostolate. 
 Michal Kramarek, Thomas Gaunt, and Santiago Sordo-Palacios. 2017. "Directory of Catholic Seminaries: Part VII Europe". Washington, DC: Center for Applied Research in the Apostolate. 
 Michal Kramarek, Thomas Gaunt, and Santiago Sordo-Palacios. 2017. "Directory of Catholic Seminaries: Part VIII Oceania". Washington, DC: Center for Applied Research in the Apostolate.

External links 
 

Sem